Thembi Portia Msane is a South African Member of Parliament for the Economic Freedom Fighters. Prior to serving in parliament, she was a member of the KwaZulu-Natal Legislature from 2014 to 2019. As of September 2020, she is an alternate member of the  Portfolio Committee On Trade and Industry.

References

External links
Parliamentary biography

Living people
Year of birth missing (living people)
Place of birth missing (living people)
Zulu people
People from KwaZulu-Natal
Economic Freedom Fighters politicians
Members of the KwaZulu-Natal Legislature
Women members of provincial legislatures of South Africa
Members of the National Assembly of South Africa
Women members of the National Assembly of South Africa